Locomotive Mountain is a  mountain summit located in the Railroad Group of the Coast Mountains, in the Pemberton Valley of southwestern British Columbia, Canada. Precipitation runoff from the peak drains into tributaries of the Fraser River. The mountain's name was proposed in 1978 by mountaineer Karl Ricker of the Alpine Club of Canada, in association with Railroad Pass, Railroad Creek, and other railroad-related names of the immediate vicinity. The toponym was officially adopted January 23, 1979, by the Geographical Names Board of Canada.


Climate
Based on the Köppen climate classification, Locomotive Mountain is located in a subarctic climate zone of western North America. Most weather fronts originate in the Pacific Ocean, and travel east toward the Coast Mountains where they are forced upward by the range (Orographic lift), causing them to drop their moisture in the form of rain or snowfall. As a result, the Coast Mountains experience high precipitation, especially during the winter months in the form of snowfall. Winter temperatures can drop below −20 °C with wind chill factors below −30 °C. The mountain and its climate supports Train Glacier on its northern slopes. The months July through September offer the most favorable weather for climbing Locomotive Mountain.

See also

 Geography of British Columbia
 Geology of British Columbia

References

Gallery

External links
 Weather: Locomotive Mountain 
 Locomotive Mountain ski ascent: YouTube

Two-thousanders of British Columbia
Pacific Ranges
Lillooet Land District
Pemberton Valley